Cook County is a 2008-2009 American independent drama film written, directed, and produced by the Houston based filmmaker David Pomes.  The film stars Anson Mount, Xander Berkeley, and Ryan Donowho and deals with the effects of the addiction to the drug methamphetamine on a Texas family.

In an interview appearing on indiewire.com, Pomes stated: "The story began about people who I have been around, living outside of civilization, out in the woods, down a dirt road with all the old stereotypes: the roof caving in and the tires in the front yard. The story is about that group of people, and the family trying to be a family in the backwoods environment. Crystal meth was always out there. I was never at any crystal meth parties or anything like that, but there were always people where I lived outside of Houston. Those are the characters in the film, but crystal meth really drives the story. It's the vehicle."

Not having direct contact with crystal meth addicts, Pomes read widely on the subject of drug addiction.  Explained Pomes in an interview for Filmmaker Magazine: "I did a ton of research. Mostly just through the Internet, through magazine articles and things of that nature. I did a lot. There is so much out there. People on meth like to talk about it. They like to take about the process of making it, the problems they have with it. There are tons of blogs out there, websites, people write songs and poetry about it [laughs]. Not in a good way necessarily, or a glorifying way, but just how it’s affected there lives. There’s recipes out there, you don’t just have to make it one way. There’s a bunch of different ways to do it. We found lots of pictures of people on meth and meth labs and used those to inspire us a bit for wardrobe, makeup, art direction, the general aesthetic of the movie."

References

External links 
 
 
 

American drama films
American independent films
2009 films
Films set in Houston
Films shot in Texas
Films shot in Houston
2000s English-language films
2000s American films